"Fearless" is the 3rd single to be released from Australian singer, Wes Carr's second studio album, The Way the World Looks. It was released on 12 June 2009.

Promotion
The song gained some buzz, based on the fact actors from hit Australian T.V series Underbelly are featured in the clip. Promotional posters were also released.

Track listing
Australian CD Single
Fearless
My Home Town

Charts
The song was the number-one most added track to Australian radio in its first week of release.

References

2009 singles
Wes Carr songs
Songs written by Adam Argyle
2009 songs
Sony BMG singles
Songs written by Wes Carr